Glasgow Blackfriars and Hutchesontown, representing parts of the city of Glasgow, Scotland, was a burgh constituency represented in the House of Commons of the Parliament of the United Kingdom from 1885 until 1918.

It elected one Member of Parliament (MP) using the first-past-the-post voting system.

Boundaries

The Redistribution of Seats Act 1885 provided that the constituency was to consist of the sixth and fourteenth Municipal Wards.

The constituency was described in the Glasgow Parliamentary Divisions Act 1896 as being-

"In the first place, the area within a line beginning at a point in the centre of Albert Bridge, where the same intersects the centre of the River Clyde, northwards along the centre of that bridge, Saltmarket and High Street, to a point opposite the centre of Rottenrow; thence westwards along the centre of Rottenrow to the centre of John Street; thence southwards along the centre of John Street to the centre of Ingram Street; thence westwards along the centre of Ingram Street to a point opposite the centre of Glassford Street; thence southwards along the centres of Glassford Street, Stockwell Street, and the line of Victoria Bridge to a point where the same intersects the centre of the River Clyde; thence eastwards along the centre of the River Clyde to the centre of the line of Albert Bridge, the point first described. And, in the second place, the area within a line beginning at a point in the centre of the River Clyde immediately opposite the centre line of Thistle Street; southwards along the centre of Thistle Street to the centre of Caledonia Road; thence eastwards along the centre of Caledonia Road to the centre of Crown Street; thence southwards along the centres of Crown Street and Cathcart Road to a point where the said road is intersected by the southern parliamentary boundary of the city; thence following the said boundary in an easterly, westerly, and northerly direction till it reaches the centre of the River Clyde; thence along the centre of the River Clyde in a westerly, northerly, and westerly direction, until it reaches the point therein opposite the centre of Thistle Street first described."

Members of Parliament

Election results 1885-1918

Elections in the 1880s

Elections in the 1890s

Elections in the 1900s

Elections in the 1910s

General Election 1914–15:

Another General Election was required to take place before the end of 1915. The political parties had been making preparations for an election to take place and by July 1914, the following candidates had been selected;
Labour: George Barnes
Unionist: James Lovat-Fraser

References 

Historic parliamentary constituencies in Scotland (Westminster)
Politics of Glasgow
Constituencies of the Parliament of the United Kingdom established in 1885
Constituencies of the Parliament of the United Kingdom disestablished in 1918